King Lake is an unincorporated community and census-designated place in Douglas County, Nebraska, United States. The population was 280 at the 2010 census. Of the population, 218 people are male and 62 are female. The population density is 125.09 people/sq. mi.

Demographics

References

Census-designated places in Douglas County, Nebraska
Census-designated places in Nebraska